Ribera is an unincorporated community and census-designated place in San Miguel County, New Mexico.

Geography 
The town is divided by Interstate 25 and Route 3, which was along the original Route 66, and a great deal of evidence from the famous motor-tourist route still remains in the form of old rusted cars and long abandoned structures. The area is home to many artists and ranchers. The town has a now closed gas station and general store called Sunshine Station. The town had one restaurant that is a well-known landmark throughout the surrounding area named La Risa Cafe (formerly known as the Sad Cafe), as well as a nearby general store of the same name; the hours of operation are sporadic.

East of Ribera is the site of the Imus Ranch, a non-profit organization that from 1999 to 2014 helped children of all ages afflicted with cancer. The FOX Business program Imus in the Morning regularly broadcast from the Imus Ranch.

South of Ribera is San Miguel del Vado, an even smaller unincorporated community and a former stop on the Santa Fe Trail. West of Ribera is the Glorieta Mesa portion of the Santa Fe National Forest.

Demographics

Education
It is in the West Las Vegas Schools school district. West Las Vegas High School is the area high school.

Notable people
 Richard Vigil, former member of the New Mexico House of Representatives

References

Related links
Ribera :: New Mexico Tourism Department
El Ancon Sculpture Park at the International Sculpture Center

Unincorporated communities in San Miguel County, New Mexico
Unincorporated communities in New Mexico
Census-designated places in San Miguel County, New Mexico
Census-designated places in New Mexico